Kheirieh Jarkas (1922–2022), known mononymously as Nourhane, was an Arabic singer and actress in the 1940s, 1950s, and 1960s.

Early life 
Jarkas was born in Damascus (registered in the civil registries of Quneitra in the Golan Heights) in 1922 to parents of Circassian origin, Ali and Maryam.

She started singing at a young age, memorizing songs she heard on the radio and record-players, and reciting them at all-women traditional musical gatherings (istiqbal) that her mother and her friends would organize.

An orphan at the age of 7, she was sent to boarding school, and married at the age of 14 to a Lebanese man, a teacher, linguist, and translator, Kassem Kassem, who mastered 11 languages and who had settled in Aleppo to teach. Nourhane encouraged him to further his career by applying for a scholarship to study English literature in Cairo which he received. Together with their son, they moved to Cairo.

Career 
For economic reasons, and due to the shortcomings of Kassem's stipend, Nourhane started working as an extra on movies (notably Honey Moon (1945) starring Farid al-Atrash where she can be seen sitting at a table, listening to the legendary singer and actor).

Her professional name, Nourhane, was made up of the first part of the name of Lebanese singer Nour El Hoda and the last part of the name of Syrian singer and princess Asmahan. She acted in three feature films: Good and Evil (1946), Son of the Orient (1946), and Leila in Iraq (1949).

Through the first film Good and Evil, she met Mohamed Salman, who would eventually become her second husband, and her partner in professional and personal life for five years.

She sang professionally on stage and through radio stations in Lebanon, Syria, Egypt, Tunisia, Iraq, Kuwait, and more. The Syrian national radio station in Damascus holds hundreds of her recordings in perfect condition. Composers who wrote music for her to sing included Mohamed Mohsen, Mohamed Abdelkarim, Mohammed Abdel Wahab, Salim Helou, and Wadih Al-Safi. The 6th number of the Syrian National Radio Station magazine in its first year, entitled "Radio Diffusion Syrienne", mentions several weekly evening program broadcasts featuring Nourhane. On November 25, the evening program beginning at 6:30PM featured Nourhane singing "A little bit of my heart remains" composed by Mohamed Mohsen with lyrics by Omar Halabi, as well "Why do I love you?" composed by Abdel Wahab Karam with words by Ibrahim Kamel. On November 30, 1953, starting with Nourhane at 9:30pm singing "I called you my love" by Mohamed Mohsen with lyrics by Abdel Jalil Wehbe - followed by a 15 minute recorded improvisation by the buzuq virtuoso and Nourhane's friend Mohamed Abdelkarim. The same magazine also features a large portrait of Nourhane on its cover

From her personal archive, another issue of the same magazine features a portrait of Nourhane on its cover.

Since she was disappointed with the quality of the films she appeared in, although they may have had a certain degree of commercial success, she decided to opt out of any additional filmmaking adventures.

American researcher and educator Richard Melvin Breaux wrote "As Nourhane, Kheirieh continued to sing on stage and on radio, she recorded and through Farid El-Atrash, her music made its way state side and to Alamphon Records’ Farid Alam al-Din."

Later life 
Nourhane ended her career in the beginning of the 1960s and she opened up a hair salon in the Arnous area of Damascus. Her granddaughter, May Kassem made a film narrating her life story entitled "Nourhane, a child’s dream" which came out in 2016. Nourhane lived to be a hundred and died, at home, surrounded by her family, on February 28, 2022, in Beirut.

Bibliography 

Nourhane - Actress/Singer (as Norhan) listed in El-Cinema Egyptian Cinema Online Archive: Norhan - Actor Filmography، photos، Video

Songs 

 "Ya Om Al Ouyoun al Kahila" (composer: Mohamed Mohsen) ياام العيون الكحيلة  Nourhan sings Mohamad Mohsen
 "Hajarni wou Rah" (composer: Philemon Wehbe) هجرني وراح  Nourhan sings Philemon Wehbe- Hajarni
 "Ishtaqna ya helou" (composer: Salim Helou) اشتقنا يا حلو Nourhan sings Salim Helou
 "Ya Zeno" (composer: Wadih Al-Safi) يا زينو (وديع الصافي) Nourhan sings Wadih Assafi
 "Fat Yom Min Ghayr Ma Tkalemni" (Composer: Abd al Wahab)(Radio Broadcast) فات يوم من غير ماتكلمني (اذاعية بصوت نورهان ) لحن عبد الوهاب فات يوم من غير ماتكلمني (اذاعية بصوت نورهان ) لحن عبد الوهاب
 "Mijana and Itaba" (with Mohamed Salman) - excerpt from film "Leila in Iraq" (1949) Dir. Ahmed Kamel Morsi ميجانا وعتابا (مع محمد سلمان) فيلم ليلى في العراق  Nourhan- Mijana w Ataba (1949)

Films listed in El Cinema Egyptian Cinema Archive 

 Son of the Orient (1945) Dir. Ibrahim Helmi فيلم - ابن الشرق - 1945 طاقم العمل، فيديو، الإعلان، صور، النقد الفني، مواعيد العرض
 Good and Evil (1946 release) (shot in 1945) Dir. Hassan Helmi فيلم - الخير والشر - 1946 طاقم العمل، فيديو، الإعلان، صور، النقد الفني، مواعيد العرض
 Leila in Iraq (1949) Dir. Ahmed Kamel Morsi فيلم - ليلى في العراق - 1949 طاقم العمل، فيديو، الإعلان، صور، النقد الفني، مواعيد العرض, الفيلم العراقي ـ ليلى في العراق ـ عفيفة اسكندر، ابراهيم جلال ـ ١٩٤٩

Anthology

Press

Documentary

References 

1922 births
2022 deaths
People from Damascus
Syrian people of Circassian descent
20th-century Syrian actresses
Syrian film actresses
20th-century Syrian women singers
Actresses from Cairo
Singers from Cairo
Syrian emigrants to Egypt
Syrian radio actresses
Syrian businesspeople
Deaths in Lebanon
Actresses from Beirut
Women centenarians
Syrian centenarians
Syrian emigrants to Lebanon